Bertoldo di Giovanni (after 1420, in Poggio a Caiano – 28 December 1491, in Florence) was an Italian Renaissance sculptor and medallist.

Life
Bertoldo was a pupil of Donatello. He worked in Donatello's workshop for many years, completing Donatello's unfinished works after his death in 1466,<ref>Bertoldo di Giovanni, Encyclopædia Britannica', retrieved 26 April 2015.</ref> for example the bronze pulpit reliefs from the life of Christ in the Basilica di San Lorenzo di Firenze in Florence.

Bertoldo later became head and teacher of the informal academy for painters and in particular for sculptors, which Lorenzo de' Medici had founded in his garden. At the same time, Bertoldo was the custodian of the Roman antiquities there. Though Bertoldo was not a major sculptor, some of the most significant sculptors of their time attended this school, such as Michelangelo, Baccio da Montelupo, Giovanni Francesco Rustici and Jacopo Sansovino.

Works
Di Giovanni was the sculptor of a medal of Sultan Mohammed II (see image). Di Giovanni along with a number of collaborators created the "Frieze for the portico of the Medici Villa at Poggio a Caiano.
He is the author of several medals that were formerly attributed by error to Antonio del Pollaiuolo.

References

External links
Leonardo da Vinci: anatomical drawings from the Royal Library, Windsor Castle, exhibition catalog fully online as PDF from The Metropolitan Museum of Art, which contains material on Bertoldo di Giovanni (see index)
European sculpture and metalwork, a collection catalog from The Metropolitan Museum of Art Libraries (fully available online as PDF), which contains material on Bertoldo di Giovanni (see index)Bertoldo di Giovanni: The Renaissance of Sculpture in Medici Florence'', an exhibition at the Frick Collection and accompanying catalogue 

15th-century births
1491 deaths
People from the Province of Florence
Renaissance sculptors
Italian medallists
Year of birth uncertain
15th-century Italian sculptors
Italian male sculptors
Italian Renaissance sculptors